Joo Sang-wook (born July 18, 1978) is a South Korean actor. He is best known for his roles in generational saga Giant, medical drama Good Doctor, romantic comedy Cunning Single Lady, Birth of a Beauty, and crime procedural Special Affairs Team TEN.

Personal life
Joo Sang-wook and actress Cha Ye-ryun had been dating since March 2016, and married in May 2017. Cha announced that she was expecting their first child in December 2017. They had a girl on July 31, 2018

Filmography

Television series

Film

Variety show

Music video

Hosting

Discography

Awards and nominations

References

External links 
 Joo Sang-wook Fan Cafe at Daum
 
 
 

1978 births
Living people
Male actors from Seoul
South Korean male film actors
South Korean male television actors
Seoul High School alumni